Triton International Limited. is a leasing company based in Hamilton, Bermuda, specializing in intermodal freight equipment leasing and maritime container management services. The company's fleet included 7.1 million TEU containers, open tops, flat racks, generator sets and chassis. In July 2016, the company merged with Triton Container International to form Triton International, the largest container leasing company with a market share of 26%. TAL International's then-CEO Brian Sondey went on to head Triton International.

In Fall 2022, Triton's then-CFO John Burns announced his planned retirement, and the company later announced internal candidate Michael Pearl would take over as CFO

See also
List of largest container shipping companies

References

External links 
 Official Website

Companies listed on the New York Stock Exchange
Container shipping companies
Transport companies established in 1963